William Bull (1828-1902) was an English botanist, nurseryman and plant collector. He was born in Winchester and in 1861 purchased the nursery of John Weeks and Company in King's Road, Chelsea. He introduced into cultivation, plants from other countries, including orchids from Colombia and Liberia.

The vast stock of the firm William Bull And Sons, headquartered at Kings Road, Chelsea, made it famous worldwide. When Ceylon was struck by a coffee-plant disease, Hemileia vastatrix, it was able to supply planters with a variety called Coffea liberica, which was immune to the disease. With the retirement of Edward Bull in 1916, by then the sole proprietor, the firm closed.

References

English botanists
1828 births
1902 deaths